Nurul Islam is a Rohingya political activist and Yangon-educated lawyer from Myanmar (Burma). He is the president of the Arakan Rohingya National Organisation (ARNO) and lives with his family in London, the United Kingdom.

Political activism
Islam is the president of the Arakan Rohingya National Organisation (ARNO), a political organisation that campaigns for the rights of the Rohingya people, an ethnic minority in northern Rakhine State, Myanmar. He has worked closely with other organisations, such as the National United Party of Arakan, a Rakhine nationalist political party.

Islam is a vocal political activist, having held multiple peaceful rallies outside the Burmese embassy in London, where he resides. He, along with his associates, has called on the international community to "protect the defenseless Rohingyas".

Education
Islam achieved a Bachelor of Arts (B.A.) and a Bachelors of Law (LL.B.) from Rangoon University (now the University of Yangon) in 1972 and 1973 respectively. He completed a Diplomacy Training Program course at the University of New South Wales in Australia, and achieved a masters (LL.M.) in Human Rights from the University of East London in 2007.

References

Living people
Political activists
Rohingya people
Burmese emigrants to the United Kingdom
Year of birth missing (living people)